Bassetlaw is a local government district in Nottinghamshire, England. The district has four towns: Worksop, Tuxford, Harworth Bircotes and Retford. It is bounded to the north by the Metropolitan Boroughs of Doncaster and Rotherham, the east by West Lindsey, the west by both the Borough of Chesterfield and North East Derbyshire and the south by Mansfield District and Newark and Sherwood. The district is along with Bolsover District, North East Derbyshire and Borough of Chesterfield is a non-constituent member of the Sheffield City Region.

History 

Bassetlaw was created as a non-metropolitan district in 1974 by the merger of the municipal boroughs of Worksop and East Retford and most of Worksop Rural District and East Retford Rural District following the passage of the Local Government Act 1972. 

Local Government in Nottinghamshire is organised on a two-tier basis, with local district councils such as Bassetlaw District Council responsible for local services such as housing, local planning and refuse collection and Nottinghamshire County Council responsible for "wide-area" services, including education, social services and public transport.

The district is named after the ancient Bassetlaw wapentake of Nottinghamshire.

Settlements 
Bassetlaw is divided into 66 parishes, each governed by an elected parish council or parish meeting. The two main settlements of Retford and Worksop are the only areas of the district that are unparished, however, both towns are entitled to elect a town mayor via their respective charter trustees.

Politics

Parliamentary constituency 

The constituency was created in 1885 by the Redistribution of Seats Act. Bassetlaw was for many years a safe seat for the Labour Party. Labour first won the seat in the 1929 general election. However, its Member of parliament Malcolm MacDonald was one of the few Labour MPs to join his father Ramsay MacDonald's National Government. MacDonald held the seat as a National Labour candidate in the 1931 election, but was defeated at the next election in 1935 by Labour's Frederick Bellenger.

The constituency was held by the Labour Party until December 2019, when the incumbent Labour MP John Mann stood down to take on a full-time role as the government's antisemitism tsar. He was later given a life peerage in Theresa May's resignation honours list, styling himself Baron Mann, of Holbeck Moor in the City of Leeds. In the 2019 general election the Conservative Party candidate Brendan Clarke-Smith won the seat with the biggest swing in the election, turning a 4,852 Labour majority into a 14,013 Conservative majority and becoming the first non-Labour MP to represent the constituency in 90 years.

Members of Parliament:
1929-1935 Malcolm MacDonald (Labour, National Labour)
1935-1968 Frederick Bellenger (Labour)
1968-2001 Joe Ashton (Labour)
2001-2019 John Mann (Labour)
2019-current Brendan Clarke-Smith Conservative

Council elections 

Bassetlaw District Council was created in 1974 following the passage of the Local Government Act 1972. The first elections to the council took place on 7 June 1973, which resulted in the Labour Party taking control of the newly created council after winning 29 of 51 seats available. Following the next set of elections in 1976, the Labour Party lost its majority and no single party held a majority of seats. Labour regained control of the council following the 1979 local elections and continued to hold a majority of seats on the council for a further 25 years until they once again lost their majority in 2004. In 2006, the Conservatives gained control of the council for the first time and held control until 2010 when a series of by-election defeats caused them to lose their majority. Labour regained control of the council in 2011 for the first time in seven years and has been in control of the council since.

The most recent council election on 2 May 2019 resulted in the Labour Party retaining its control of the council with an increased majority. The Conservative Party suffered its worst defeat in Bassetlaw since 1973, winning only 5 seats of the 12 seats it was defending. Both Independents and Labour gained seats from the Conservatives. The Liberal Democrats gained a seat from Labour in East Retford West, the first Liberal Democrat elected in Bassetlaw since 2006.

Wards 
Bassetlaw is divided into 25 wards for electoral purposes. Each ward returns either one, two or three councillors at each election depending upon the number of electors within each ward.

Demography

Population

Religion

Town twinning 
 Farmers Branch, Texas, USA
 Garbsen, Germany
 Pfungstadt, Germany
 Aurillac, France

References 

 
Non-metropolitan districts of Nottinghamshire